Cavia is a municipality located in the province of Burgos, Castile and León, Spain.

References

External links
Asociación Río Cavia 

Municipalities in the Province of Burgos